Slijepčević is a Serbian surname, derived from the nickname slijepče, meaning "blind one". It may refer to:

Vladan Slijepčević (1930–1989), Serbian film director and screenwriter.
Živko Slijepčević (born 1957), Serbian football manager and former player.
Đoko M. Slijepčević (1907–1993), Serbian historian.

See also
Slepčević, surname
Sljepčević, surname
Slijepčevići, settlement in Bosnia and Herzegovina
Slepčević, settlement in Serbia

Serbian surnames